Elden Jerome Campbell (born July 23, 1968) is an American former professional basketball player who played as a power forward and center in the National Basketball Association (NBA) from 1990 to 2005. He spent his first nine years with the Los Angeles Lakers and the rest with various other teams.

Playing career
Campbell attended Morningside High School in Inglewood, California before playing college basketball at Clemson University. During his four years at Clemson, he averaged 15.3 points per game, 6.8 rebounds per game and 2.7 blocks. During a one-point loss in the 1990 NCAA Tournament to a Connecticut team, his college team defended a play that consisted of a full-court catch-and-shoot play by Tate George with one second on the clock. That same year, the Los Angeles Lakers drafted Campbell with the 27th pick in the 1990 NBA draft.

On March 10, 1999, Campbell was traded by the Lakers along with Eddie Jones to the Charlotte Hornets for Glen Rice, J. R. Reid and B. J. Armstrong.

Campbell's longest tenures were with the Lakers and the Hornets (in both Charlotte and New Orleans); he would also play with the Seattle SuperSonics and briefly for the New Jersey Nets, spending most of the final two seasons of his career as a member of the Detroit Pistons, being on roster in the 2004 NBA Championship team. During Campbell's tenure with the Pistons, perhaps his most important contribution was his defense against center Shaquille O'Neal in the two playoff series in which the Pistons engaged O'Neal's teams (against the Lakers in the 2004 NBA Finals and against the Miami Heat in the 2005 NBA Eastern Conference Finals); because of his enormous bulk and strength, he presented a unique challenge to O'Neal in the low post and was one of the few NBA players who could pose a serious physical challenge to O'Neal on defense.

Campbell's 15-year career comprised 1,044 games, of which he started 671, and 106 playoff games, of which he started 53. In 15 seasons, Campbell averaged 10.3 points per game, 5.9 rebounds per game and 1.5 blocks. He was especially known for his shot-blocking ability, with 1,602 career blocks; he is 34st all time in blocks. Notably, Campbell was the Los Angeles Lakers' leading scorer between 1990–91 and 1998–99. His nicknames were 'Easy', 'Big E', 'Big Homie' and 'The Janitor', which he received for his ability to clean up the boards.

Personal life

Campbell was arrested for drunk driving in California in 1995.

See also
 List of National Basketball Association career blocks leaders

References

External links

 NBA all-time blocks standings

1968 births
Living people
American men's basketball players
Basketball players from Los Angeles
Centers (basketball)
Charlotte Hornets players
Clemson Tigers men's basketball players
Detroit Pistons players
Los Angeles Lakers draft picks
Los Angeles Lakers players
New Orleans Hornets players
New Jersey Nets players
Seattle SuperSonics players
Basketball players from Inglewood, California